The 2016 British Academy Scotland New Talent Awards took place on 14 April 2016 at the Drygate Brewery.  Presented by BAFTA Scotland, the accolades honour the best upcoming talent in the field of film and television in Scotland. The nominees were announced on 15 March 2016. The ceremony was hosted by Muriel Gray. British director Danny Boyle made a surprise guest appearance at the event to present the accolade for Best New Work.

Winners and nominees

Winners are listed first and highlighted in boldface.

Special Award for New Work
Kris Kubik - Dipper from the Water of Leith

See also
2015 British Academy Scotland Awards

References

External links
BAFTA Scotland Home page

New Talent
British Academy Scotland
British Academy Scotland New Talent Awards
British Academy Scotland New Talent Awards, 2016
British Academy Scotland New Talent Awards
British Academy Scotland New Talent Awards
British Academy Scotland New Talent Awards
British Academy Scotland New Talent Awards
British Academy Scotland New Talent Awards